Argyrodes rostratus is a species of tangle-web spider that is endemic to the Seychelles, and can be found on Mahé, Île Sèche, Cerf, Conception, Silhouette, Curieuse, Cousin, Aride, Praslin, La Digue, Grand Sœur, Felicite, Marianne, Denis islands and the Alphonse and St. François atolls. It is found in woodland, shrubby habitat and gardens, and is a kleptoparasite of red-legged golden orb-web spiders. It is threatened by habitat deterioration due to invasive plants, especially Cinnamomum verum.

References

Theridiidae
Endemic fauna of Seychelles
Spiders of Africa
Spiders of Oceania
Spiders described in 1877